Kullassina-bel  of Kish was the second king in the First Dynasty of Kish according to the Sumerian king list, which adds that he reigned for 960 years (or 900 in some copies).

As the name seems to be an Akkadian phrase meaning "All(kull) of them(assina) (were) lord(bel)", it has sometimes been suggested that the occurrence of this name on the list was intended to denote a period of no central authority in the early period of Kish.

References 

|-

Kings of Kish
Sumerian kings